The Women's Windsor round open was one of the events held in archery at the 1960 Summer Paralympics in Rome.

There were only three competitors - representing Great Britain and Rhodesia. As in the FITA round, Rhodesia's Margaret Harriman won a clear victory over British archers Irvine and Comley (full names not recorded).

References 

W
Para